Hegesander (Greek: ῾Ηγήσανδρος) may refer to:
 Hegesander (historian) (2nd century BC), Greek writer, and a citizen of Delphi
 Agesander of Rhodes (1st century BC), Greek sculptor from the island of Rhodes

Human name disambiguation pages